Brad Jackson is a New Zealand sailor that has sailed in multiple Volvo Ocean Races.

Sailing career
Jackson first sailed with NZ Endeavour in the 1993-94 Whitbread Round the World Race. He then sailed on Merit Cup in the 1997-98 Whitbread Round the World Race before joining Team Tyco for the 2001-02 Volvo Ocean Race.

He was a member of ABN Amro I in 2005-06, Ericsson 4 in 2008-09 and Mar Mostro in  2011-12.

He coached Team SCA in the 2014-15 edition.

For the 2017–18 Volvo Ocean Race, Jackson was originally named as a watch captain for Team AkzoNobel before being promoted to skipper following the sacking of Simeon Tienpont. Tienpont was then reinstated by an arbitration panel, resulting in Jackson deciding not to sail in leg 1.

References

Living people
New Zealand male sailors (sport)
Volvo Ocean Race sailors
Year of birth missing (living people)